Polythionates are oxoanions with the formula  (n ≥ 0). They occur naturally and are the products of redox reactions of thiosulfate. Polythionates are readily isolable, unlike the parent polythionic acids.

Preparation
Many members of the polythionates have been characterized: dithionate, trithionate, tetrathionate, pentathionate, etc.

These salts are often generated by oxidation of thiosulfate. For example, tetrathionate is obtained by oxidation of thiosulfate ion with iodine (reaction is used in iodometry):

More specialized routes involve reactions of sulfur chlorides with bisulfite salts:

Initially prismatic crystals of potassium tetrathionate appear, then lamellar crystals of potassium pentathionate, from which the influence of tartaric acid makes an aqueous solution of pentathionic acid.

References

Sulfur compounds